This page lists public opinion polls in connection with the 2000 Russian presidential election.

First round

1997 polls

1998 polls

1999 polls

2000 polls

Hypothetical second round polls

With Chernomyrdin

With Kiriyenko

With Lebed

With Luzhkov

With Nemtsov

With Primakov

With Putin

With Ryzhkov

With Shoigu

With Stepashin

With Yavlinsky

With Zyuganov

With Zhirinovsky

With Yeltsin

Subnational polls

Moscow

Notes

Sources

Opinion
Presidential
Russia